HNK may refer to:
 Croatian National Corpus
 Croatian National Theatre (disambiguation)
 Honokiol, a lignan
 Hydroxynorketamine, HNK, a metabolite of ketamine